True Devotion is Rocky Votolato's sixth full-length studio album, and third release from Barsuk Records.

Track listing
 Lucky Clover Coin
 Fragments
 Red River
 Eyes Like Static
 Sparklers
 Instruments
 What Waited For Me
 Sun Devil
 Don't Be Angry
 Where We Started

References

External links
 Official Website
 Barsuk Records

Rocky Votolato albums
2010 albums